Meshaoba is a village in the Balakan Rayon of Azerbaijan.

References 

Populated places in Balakan District